Nina Aigner (born 20 June 1980) is a former Austrian international football player. She played her entire senior career for Bayern Munich, and also played on the Austrian national team between 1998 and 2006.

Aigner played as a midfield, but was renowned for her goal scoring qualities. She was the second top scorer of the 2002-03 Bundesliga, next to Inka Grings.

She currently serves as the Austrian national team's assistant coach.

References

External links 
 Profile at Bayern Munich

1980 births
Living people
Austrian women's footballers
FC Bayern Munich (women) players
Austria women's international footballers
USC Landhaus Wien players
Expatriate women's footballers in Germany
Austrian expatriate women's footballers
Austrian expatriate sportspeople in Germany
Women's association football midfielders
ÖFB-Frauenliga players
Frauen-Bundesliga players
Union Kleinmünchen players